Phara Anacharsis (born 17 December 1983) is a French athlete who specializes in the 400 metres and the 400 metres hurdles.

Biography
She was born in Fort-de-France. In the 200 metres she won the bronze medal at the 2005 Jeux de la Francophonie, and in the 400 meters the silver medal at the 2005 Mediterranean Games. She also competed at the 2002 World Junior Championships, the 2005 European Indoor Championships and the 2006 European Championships without reaching the final. She later turned to the hurdles, and won the gold medal at the 2009 Mediterranean Games.

In the 4 x 400 metres relay she finished seventh at the 2006 European Championships, and also competed at the 2007 World Championships and the 2008 Olympic Games without reaching the final.  At the 2012 Summer Olympics, she was part of the French team that came 6th in the final.  At the 2014 European championships, she ran in the heats but not the final, when France won the gold.

In the 400 m hurdles, she competed at the 2013 World Championships but did not reach the final.

Her personal best times are 23.39 seconds in the 200 metres, achieved in August 2007 in La Chaux-de-Fonds; 51.87 seconds in the 400 metres, achieved in June 2008 in Patras and 55.84 seconds in the 400 metres hurdles, achieved in June 2016 in Montreuil.

References

1983 births
Living people
Sportspeople from Fort-de-France
French female sprinters
French female hurdlers
Athletes (track and field) at the 2008 Summer Olympics
Athletes (track and field) at the 2012 Summer Olympics
Athletes (track and field) at the 2016 Summer Olympics
Olympic athletes of France
Martiniquais athletes
French people of Martiniquais descent
European Athletics Championships medalists
Martiniquais sportswomen
Mediterranean Games gold medalists for France
Mediterranean Games medalists in athletics
Athletes (track and field) at the 2005 Mediterranean Games
Athletes (track and field) at the 2009 Mediterranean Games